Philomyrmex is a genus of true bugs belonging to the family Oxycarenidae.

The species of this genus are found in Northern Europe.

Species:
 Philomyrmex insignis Sahlberg, 1848

References

Oxycarenidae
Hemiptera genera